The Charlevoix South Pier Light Station is located on Lake Michigan at the entrance to Lake Charlevoix in Charlevoix County in the U.S. state of Michigan at the end of the south pier/breakwater of the channel leading to Round Lake in the city of Charlevoix.

History

The first light in Charlevoix was located on the north pier. It was erected in 1884 in order to guide ships to the newly improved Pine River channel. A lifesaving station was built just north of the lighthouse in 1898 and an oil shed was built in 1890.

The original structure survived for 63 years, but due to terminal deterioration the decision was made to replace it in 1947. In 1948 the new steel structure was installed and the light was moved to its current location on the south pier where the lens and lantern from the old structure were transferred to the new one.  The skeletal structure and general configuration of this light shares some design elements with the Alpena Light.  The South Pierhead light was originally painted Daymark red.

In 1965, because the Pine River channel is near a congested area, the Coast Guard vacated the old U.S. Life-Saving Service Station (tearing down the shingled building), and relocated to the grounds of the old Lighthouse Supply Station.

In 1989, the present steel and concrete pier replaced the old wooden pier with its concrete covering.  The present piers and revetments were constructed in the 1970s and 1980s. The construction is specially designed to withstand unusually forceful wave pressures, and to protect the harbor.  As Terry Pepper wrote: 

The skeletal north pierhead tower has since been removed.

The North Pierhead Light is at coordinates 45 19 18 N 85 15 54 W, and its characteristic is Flashing Green 2.5 seconds. The former North tower's height is 56 feet, with a focal plane of 61 feet.

Described as the Charlevoix South Pierhead Light (added 2005 - Structure - #05000346) and also known as the Charlevoix Pier Light, it is listed in the National Register of Historic Places. Specifically, it is described as "S pier at harbor entrance, 0.3 WNW of US 31 drawbridge, Charlevoix".  Although it was unmanned, the National Park System has recognized it as a "significant aid to navigation."

In 2009 the light was again painted red in keeping with the mariner's alliterative Mnemonic "Red Right returning."  For unknown reasons, previous Daymark color schemes have been green,  white. or originally red (until 1968). See Sea mark.

A primary vessel benefiting from the Charlevoix Light is the Beaver Island ferry.

The land based lighthouse keeper's residence was sold to a private owner and demolished.  The property became Hoffman Park, and all that remains is a metal plaque.

In 2008, ownership of the light was transferred from the U.S. Coast Guard to the City of Charlevoix/Charlevoix Historical Society.  The transfer was completed under the National Historic Lighthouse Preservation Act.

See also
Lighthouses in the United States

Notes

Further reading
 Harrison, Tim (editor of Lighthouse Digest and President of the American Lighthouse Foundation), (September, 2009) Ghost Lights of Michigan (Rare historic images and text on Michigan's lost and obscure lighthouse, including bonus chapters on lightships and lighthouse tenders.) East Machias, Maine: Foghorn Publishing, .

External links
 
 
 Aerial photos, Charlevoix South Pier Light Station, marinas.com.
 Anderson, Kraig, Lighthouse Friends, description Charlevoix South Pier Light.
 Antique Postcard, South Pier Light after 1914 move from Terry Pepper, Seeing the Light.
 Antique (ca. 1955) Postcard, South Pier Light with original red paint from Terry Pepper, Seeing the Light.
 Charlevoix Historical Society website
 Charlevoix Historical Society, Keep the Light on website.
 Interactive map/list/information of lighthouses in northeastern Lake Michigan by LighthousesRus
 Michigan Lighthouse project, Charlevoix South Pier
 Keepers of the Charlevoix Light at Terry Pepper, Seeing the Light.
 Map of Michigan Lighthouses from Michigan.gov
 Terry Pepper, Seeing the Light, Charlevoix Light Station.

Lighthouses completed in 1884
Lighthouses completed in 1948
Lighthouses on the National Register of Historic Places in Michigan
Buildings and structures in Charlevoix County, Michigan
Piers in Michigan
Tourist attractions in Charlevoix County, Michigan
National Register of Historic Places in Charlevoix County, Michigan